The Chimay Street Circuit (also known as Circuit de Chimay) was a street circuit in Chimay, Belgium used during the Grand Prix des Frontières between 1926 and 1972, when the event was discontinued due to safety reasons.

In 1975, a shorter  version of the Chimay Street Circuit was used in races for classic motorcycles.

Layout
The most southern corner and at the same time the slowest corner in the course borders the town of Chimay. A long straight leads to the town of Salles. Passing the church of Chlle de Arbrisseau, the most northern point is reached - the town of Thiérissart - before turning back south down the main straight.

References

Motorsport venues in Belgium
Sports venues in Hainaut (province)
Sport in Chimay